Robert Parkhurst may refer to:

 Robert Parkhurst (Lord Mayor) (1569–1636), English merchant who was Lord Mayor of London
 Robert Parkhurst (died 1674), English politician who sat in the House of Commons in 1659
 Robert Parkhurst (died 1651) (1603–1651), English politician who sat in the House of Commons between 1625 and 1651